Dermopathy can refer to one of several diseases:
 Diabetic dermopathy
 Graves' dermopathy, or infiltrative dermopathy
 Nephrogenic fibrosing dermopathy (NFD)
 Restrictive dermopathy